is a city located in Fukuoka Prefecture, Japan. It is northeast of Fukuoka City. The city was founded on October 1, 1997.

The city has an estimated population of 59,645 and a population density of about 1,400 persons per km². The total area is 42.07 km².

Koga Station is on the Kagoshima main line.

References

External links

 Koga City official website 

 
Cities in Fukuoka Prefecture